The 1988 Open Championship was a men's major golf championship and the 117th Open Championship, held from 14 to 18 July at the Royal Lytham & St Annes Golf Club in Lytham St Annes, England. In a first-ever Monday finish, Seve Ballesteros shot a final round 65 to capture his third Open Championship and fifth major title, two strokes ahead of runner-up Nick Price, the 54-hole leader.

Scheduled to finish on Sunday, heavy rain on Saturday caused flooding of several greens and the third round was scratched after play was started. Under European Tour rules, if less than half of the players had finished their rounds, the scores for that day were discarded. Since no player had finished, all the scores from Saturday were scrapped. Sunday was briefly scheduled for 36 holes, but due to the flooding, it was decided the course could not be readied in time for the early morning tee times. The third round was played on Sunday and the fourth on Monday, the first time in history the Open's final round finished on a Monday.

Course layout

Source:

Previous lengths of the course for The Open Championship (since 1950):

Past champions in the field

Made the cut

Missed the cut

Round summaries

First round
Thursday, 14 July 1988

Second round
Friday, 15 July 1988

Amateurs: Broadhurst (+4), Cook (+11), Foster (+11), Hardin (+12), Nash (+12), Rymer (+18), Prosser (+21).

Third round
Sunday, 17 July 1988

Final round
Monday, 18 July 1988

Amateurs: Broadhurst (+12).

References

External links
Royal Lytham & St Annes 1988 (Official site)
117th Open Championship - Royal Lytham & St Annes (European Tour)

The Open Championship
Golf tournaments in England
Open Championship
Open Championship
Open Championship